Torre Bormida is a comune (municipality) in the Province of Cuneo in the Italian region Piedmont, located about  southeast of Turin and about  northeast of Cuneo.

Torre Bormida borders the following municipalities: Bergolo, Bosia, Cortemilia, Cravanzana, Feisoglio, and Levice.

References

Cities and towns in Piedmont